Reed Dickens is an American Businessman and Entrepreneur based in Los Angeles. Dickens is currently the Chairman of LA Golf Partners, a holding company focused on acquiring technology, media, and consumer product companies in golf, specifically to leverage relationships with players and new consumer trends, the non traditional off-course golf industry. Dickens is a former White House Assistant Press Secretary under George W. Bush, the co-founder and former CEO of Marucci Sports, a manufacturer of premium baseball products, and Co-Founder and current Chairman of EQtainment, an ed-tech and edu-media platform that teaches kids social and emotion skills via apps, games, music, and kids content.

Early life and education 
Dickens was born on December 30, 1977, in Monroe, Louisiana, to Sam and Jenny Dickens. Dickens attended Louisiana Tech University and graduated from LSU Shreveport in 2000 with a bachelor's degree in mass communications.

After graduation, Dickens became a White House Assistant Press Secretary to Ari Fleischer under George W. Bush in 2001. From 2001 to 2004, Dickens also served as a national spokesperson for the reelection campaign.

Career
After leaving Washington and making the move to the West Coast, Dickens founded Outside Eyes, a crisis management and public affairs firm in 2005 that advised CEOs, government officials, and celebrities during all sorts of crises ranging from indictments and investigations to mergers and shareholder battles.

Dickens served as the CEO until he sold most of the business to his partner when he launched Marucci Sports with his co-founders in 2009. From 2009 to 2012, Dickens was the first CEO of Marucci Sports (served as Chairman until 2015), where he led the acquisition of Marucci Bat Co. to build a national brand out of a niche business. His aggressive approach to consumer engagement and contrast marketing toppled Louisville Slugger as the industry leader of over 100 years. Marucci is now the manufacturer of the number one bat in Major League Baseball, as well as premium metal bats, gear and apparel for the most elite youth, senior league, college, and professional players in the game. Marucci Sports announced in March 2020 that it had struck a deal with Compass Diversified to purchase the company for $200 million.

In 2012, Dickens founded Dickens Capital Group as a vehicle to invest, advise, and sit on boards of early and growth stage companies.

In 2014, Dickens co-founded EQtainment with his wife Sofia Dickens. EQtainment is the producer of the award-winning Q Wunder app and games to teach social and emotional skills to children.

Awards

As CEO of Marucci Sports, Dickens was profiled in Forbes magazine's America's Most Promising Growth Companies edition, named a top entrepreneur by Orange Coast magazine, and was also named to the Top 40 Under 40 by the Baton Rouge Business Report.

References 

1977 births
Living people
George W. Bush administration personnel
Businesspeople from Los Angeles
Louisiana State University Shreveport alumni
Businesspeople from Louisiana